is a Japanese former wrestler who competed in the 1992 Summer Olympics.

References

External links
 

1966 births
Living people
Olympic wrestlers of Japan
Wrestlers at the 1992 Summer Olympics
Japanese male sport wrestlers
Asian Games medalists in wrestling
Wrestlers at the 1990 Asian Games
Medalists at the 1990 Asian Games
Asian Games gold medalists for Japan
20th-century Japanese people
21st-century Japanese people